Tabaklar (literally "dishes" or "tanners" in Turkish) may refer to the following places in Turkey:

 Tabaklar, Ayvacık
 Tabaklar, Emirdağ, a village in the district of Emirdağ, Afyonkarahisar Province
 Tabaklar, Karataş, a village in the district of Karataş, Adana Province